Ján Šipeky (born 2 January 1973 in Košice) is a Slovak former professional cyclist.

Major results

1998
 2nd Road race, National Road Championships
2001
 1st  Team time trial, National Road Championships (with Jan Gazi, Maroš Kováč and Ján Valach)
2002
 1st  Team time trial, National Road Championships (with Radovan Husár, Maroš Kováč and Ján Valach)
2003
 3rd Overall Tour d'Egypte
2005
 1st Stage 6 Tour d'Egypte
2006
 1st Overall Tour of Maroc
2007
 1st Grand Prix de Sharm el-Sheikh
 2nd Overall Tour d'Egypte
2008
 1st Stage 5 Tour of Libya

References

External links

1973 births
Living people
Slovak male cyclists
Sportspeople from Košice